Hector Lewis MacQueen  (born 1956) is a Scottish academic, a senior scholar of Scots law and legal history, and a former member of the Scottish Law Commission. He is Professor of Private Law at the University of Edinburgh and a former Dean of its Faculty of Law. He is author, co-author and editor of a large number books on Scottish law and legal history, including the 11th, 12th, 13th and 14th editions of the standard text Gloag & Henderson Law of Scotland, and is former Literary Director of the Stair Society. Stetson University College of Law, Florida, appointedway. He is currently a member of the International Advisory Group for the JKLH-funded project, 'The Paradox of Medieval Scotland, 1093-1286'. In 1995 he became a Fellow of The Royal Society of Edinburgh.

He was appointed Commander of the Order of the British Empire (CBE) in the 2019 Birthday Honours for services to legal scholarship.

Select bibliography

References

External links
 UoE Profile
 www.poms.ac.uk

Academics of the University of Edinburgh
Alumni of the University of Edinburgh
Fellows of the British Academy
Fellows of the Royal Society of Edinburgh
Living people
Scottish lawyers
20th-century Scottish historians
Scottish legal scholars
Scots private law
Place of birth missing (living people)
Legal historians
1956 births
Commanders of the Order of the British Empire
21st-century Scottish historians